The Adventures of Long John Silver is a TV series about the Long John Silver character from Robert Louis Stevenson's 1883 novel Treasure Island.  It was made in 1954 in colour in Australia for the American and British markets before the development of Australian television.

Cast and characters
 Robert Newton as Long John Silver
 Connie Gilchrist as Purity Pinker
 Kit Taylor as Jim Hawkins
 Grant Taylor as Patch
 Eric Reiman as Trip Fenner
 John Brunskill as Old Stingley
 Harry Hambleton as Big Eric

Newton and several of the other actors had the same roles as in the 1954 film Long John Silver, also shot in Australia.

Broadcast history
The series was shown in the United States from 22 September 1955, and in the UK on ITV in 1957. It was shown in Australia on the ABC in 1958, in the afternoon Children's TV Club. It was also shown on commercial regional TV in the mid to late 70s in Australia.  In 1985 the series was repeated in the United Kingdom in a Saturday afternoon slot on ITV.

For much of its international audience, the series aired after the death of its star, Robert Newton, who had died of a heart attack in Hollywood in March 1956.

Episodes

See also
List of live television plays broadcast on Australian Broadcasting Corporation (1950s)
List of television plays broadcast on ATN-7

References

External links
 
 The Adventures of Long John Silver at Classic Australian Television
 Adventures of Long John Silver at AustLit

Australian Broadcasting Corporation original programming
1958 Australian television series debuts
1958 Australian television series endings
Black-and-white Australian television shows
Australian children's television series
Television shows set in Australia
Australian adventure television series
Television series based on Treasure Island